The 1987 Barber Saab Pro Series season was the second season of the series. All drivers used Saab powered BFGoodrich shod Mondiale chassis. Ken Murillo won the championship.

Race calendar and results

Final standings

References

Barber Dodge Pro Series
1987 in American motorsport